Kuo Po-cheng (born January 15, 1978) is a Taiwanese professional pool player, nicknamed "the Little Monster". Kuo finished first runner-up to Wu Chia-ching in the 2005 World Nine-ball Championship held in Kaohsiung, Taiwan. He was also runner-up to Francisco Bustamante in the 2010 WPA World Nine-ball Championship held in Doha, Qatar.

Titles
2010 Asian Games Eight-ball Singles

References

1978 births
Living people
Place of birth missing (living people)
Taiwanese pool players
Sportspeople from New Taipei
Asian Games medalists in cue sports
Cue sports players at the 2010 Asian Games
Asian Games gold medalists for Chinese Taipei
Medalists at the 2010 Asian Games
21st-century Taiwanese people